Judges Lodgings may refer to:
 Judges' Lodgings, Lancaster, a Grade I listed building
 Judges' Lodgings, Monmouth, a Grade II listed building
 Judges' Lodgings, York, also a Grade I listed building
Judges' Lodgings, Northampton, a Grade II* listed building
Judge's Lodging, Presteigne, a Museum in Powys, Wales
The Judges Lodgings, Gloucester, a Grade II listed building